La Boissière is the name of several communes in France:

 La Boissière, Calvados, in the Calvados département
 La Boissière, Eure, in the Eure département
 La Boissière, Hérault, in the Hérault département
 La Boissière, Jura, in the Jura département
 La Boissière, Mayenne, in the Mayenne département

Also part of the name of:
 La Boissière-d'Ans, in the Dordogne département
 La Boissière-de-Montaigu, in the Vendée département
 La Boissière-des-Landes, in the Vendée département
 La Boissière-du-Doré, in the Loire-Atlantique département
 La Boissière-École, in the Yvelines département
 La Boissière-en-Gâtine, in the Deux-Sèvres département
 La Boissière-sur-Èvre, in the Maine-et-Loire département

See also 
 Laboissière (disambiguation)